Palasa revenue division is an administrative division in the Srikakulam district of the Indian state of Andhra Pradesh. It is one of the three revenue divisions in the district and comprises 8 mandals. It was formed on 4 April 2022.

Administration 
The revenue division comprises 8 mandals: Ichchapuram, Kanchili, Kaviti, Mandasa, Nandigam, Palasa, Sompeta, and Vajrapukottur.

References 

2022 establishments in Andhra Pradesh
Revenue divisions in Andhra Pradesh
Srikakulam district